"Law & Disorder" is the 15th episode of the third season of the American police drama television series Homicide: Life on the Street. It originally aired on NBC on February 24, 1995. The episode was written by Bonnie Mark and Julie Martin and directed by John McNaughton. The episode concludes elements of a storyline about the shooting of Beau Felton, Kay Howard, and Stanley Bolander.

Plot summary  
Because he responded to the call about the murder of Gordon Pratt—the prime suspect in the shooting of Bolander, Felton, and Howard— Tim Bayliss is given the unpleasant task of investigating the murder.  Despite his protests, Lt. Al Giardello orders Bayliss to question the other officers in the Homicide unit, which makes him highly unpopular among his co-workers.  No one in the unit considers Pratt's death to be unfortunate, and they all, to varying degrees, are offended by Bayliss's questions, despite the knowledge that he is merely following orders.  The problem is compounded when Giardello, dissatisfied by the investigation's dead end, orders Bayliss to double check the detectives' alibis.  Bayliss discovers that Det. John Munch has provided a false alibi for shooting Pratt.  Bayliss confronts Munch, who responds by defiantly providing an even weaker alibi and offering to let Bayliss examine his service firearm.  Exhausted from having to question his fellow detectives, Bayliss chooses not to press the matter and later convinces Giardello that the murder is unsolvable.

Frank Pembleton, who usually partners with Bayliss, objects to his questions in a more subtle way by choosing to not be his partner on the case.  Instead, he takes the case of a woman shot dead in a parking lot, and asks Meldrick Lewis to partner with him on the case—a whim he soon regrets.  At the scene of the crime, Meldrick and Frank are confused by the fact that no one saw the shooter or even heard a gunshot, and a witness expresses the opinion that it must be "one of those black kids who go around shooting off guns."  Pembleton points out that, statistically, the witness is probably correct that the shooter came from the projects, while Meldrick is offended by Pembleton's assumption that the shooter is probably black.  Meldrick also objects to Pembleton's method of starting the investigation by working their way down the list of registered handguns, pointing out that most crimes are committed by people with stolen or unregistered guns.  At first, the detectives are surprised when Pembleton's list immediately leads to a woman who confesses to murder.  However, the murder turns out to be unrelated to their case, as the confession comes from a woman who had shot her boyfriend two days before, and mistakenly believes that Meldrick and Frank have come to arrest her. They eventually find the perpetrator in the parking lot shooting: a little girl, living three doors down from the victim, who took her father's gun from its cabinet and fired it into the air without knowing where the bullet would land. Afterward, Meldrick and Frank make peace by saying that if they caught the same case again, each would investigate it exactly as he did this one.

With all of his detectives either in the hospital or on other cases, Lt. Giardello takes a rare case as a primary, and reluctantly agrees to partner with Felton, who begs to be put back on duty after his hospitalization.  At the crime scene, Felton is visibly upset by the body, and Giardello's initial concern is replaced with anger when Felton, more traumatized by his shooting than he had admitted, loses his temper and shouts at Giardello in the squad room. Giardello bluntly tells Beau that trauma is only the latest in a long line of excuses for substandard work as a detective, and that he has never been good enough for Homicide.

In a comical subplot, the return of Bolander's memory (the previous episode had established temporary memory loss as a result of complications from the gunshot to his head) prompts Munch to relax his vigil by Bolander's bed.  Munch returns to the station, to find himself the laughing stock of everyone who sees him.  The reason why remains a mystery until Meldrick advises him to visit the art gallery across the street, where Munch discovers that the main exhibit is a giant nude photograph of Munch, taken when he was a younger man.  Munch confronts the artist, who turns out to be Brigitta, a bitter ex-girlfriend seeking to humiliate Munch, in revenge for him breaking her heart years ago.  Brigitta refuses to remove the photograph, but compromises by covering the photographic Munch's genital area with a poster.  Unfortunately, their public argument draws even more attention to the photograph, which becomes the subject of a newspaper article.

Cultural references 
The title is a reference to Homicide'''s sister show, Law & Order.  The episode's cold open features a cameo from Det. Mike Logan, a character from Law & Order, who meets with Pembleton to hand over a fugitive who fled from Baltimore to New York City.  Although the opening is unrelated to events in the rest of the episode, it bears a narrative significance in linking the continuities of Homicide and Law & Order. Over the course of the next four years, after Logan was replaced by the character of Rey Curtis, Homicide would use more intricate storylines to cross over with Law & Order three more times. In addition, the character of Munch would be transplanted to the series Law & Order: Special Victims Unit after the Homicide'' series finale in 1999.

References 
Kalat, David P. (1998). Homicide: Life on the Street: The Unofficial Companion. Los Angeles, California: Renaissance Books. .
McNaughton, John. (2003). Homicide Life on the Street - Season 3 (episode "Law & Disorder"). [DVD]. A&E Home Video.

1995 American television episodes
Homicide: Life on the Street (season 3) episodes
Crossover television